Zbyněk Pospěch (born 24 October 1982) is a Czech football forward who plays for SV Oberndorf in Austria.

Career

Pospěch started his career with hometown side Opava, where he spent five years before later playing top-flight football for Slovácko and Slovan Liberec. He then headed out of the Czech Republic, spending time at Odd Grenland in Norway and Artmedia Bratislava in Slovakia. In 2009, he returned to the Czech Republic to play for Brno.

Pospěch joined Second League side Opava in September 2009, five years after having left his boyhood club. In November 2009, the Czech Disciplinary Commission suspended Pospěch, which left him unable to play professional football until October 2010.

Pospěch moved on loan from Brno to Slavia Prague in February 2011 until the end of June. Pospěch missed almost two years of league football before scoring on his return to action in a 1–0 win for Slavia Prague against former club Slovan Liberec in March 2011. He finished the spring part of the 2010–11 Czech First League as Slavia's top scorer with seven goals. In June 2011, as his loan was coming to an end, he signed a three-year contract with Slavia. Despite scoring a total of 13 league goals in a season and a half with Slavia, making him their leading scorer, Slavia terminated Pospěch's contract in June 2012, leaving him free to look for a new club.

After signing for Dukla Prague in the summer of 2012, Pospěch took until October 2012 to score his first league goal for the club, which came in a 1–0 win against Hradec Králové. He finished the season with 9 goals from 28 matches. Pospěch scored four goals in a match, becoming just the fifth player in the history of the Czech league to do so, in July 2013 during Dukla's 4–0 win against Sigma Olomouc. He finished the month in second place in the league's Player of the Month competition behind Plzeň striker Tomáš Wágner. In his second season at Dukla, he scored 16 goals, becoming the second highest scorer in the league for the season.

Pospěch signed a two year contract with German 3. Liga club Energie Cottbus in July 2014.

References

External links

1982 births
Czech footballers
Czech Republic youth international footballers
Czech expatriate footballers
Sportspeople from Opava
Czech First League players
SFC Opava players
1. FC Slovácko players
AC Sparta Prague players
FC Slovan Liberec players
FC Zbrojovka Brno players
SK Slavia Prague players
FK Dukla Prague players
FC Energie Cottbus players
Odds BK players
FC Petržalka players
Expatriate footballers in Slovakia
Czech expatriate sportspeople in Slovakia
Slovak Super Liga players
Living people
Eliteserien players
Expatriate footballers in Norway
Czech expatriate sportspeople in Norway
Expatriate footballers in Germany
Czech expatriate sportspeople in Germany
Expatriate footballers in Austria
Czech expatriate sportspeople in Austria
3. Liga players
Association football forwards